= Mahkam Pulodova =

Mahkam Tohirovna Pulodova (born 25 February 1928) was a Tajikistani obstetrician and gynaecologist of the Soviet era.

Born into a working-class family in Samarkand, Pulodova received her early education in local Russian schools, and graduated from the Tajikistan State Medical Institute in 1949. She was a graduate student from 1950 until 1953; during this time, in 1952, she joined the Communist Party of the Soviet Union. From 1954 until 1957 she was employed at the Tajikistan State Medical Institute; from 1958 to 1962 she served as acting Minister of Health of the Tajik SSR. In 1962 she became an assistant professor and Senior Scientific Worker, becoming a full Doctor of Medicine in 1967 and a professor in 1968. From that year until 1970 she served as prorector of scientific affairs, and in 1971 she became the head of the Tajikistan State Medical Institute's Department of Obstetrics and Gynecology, from which position she later retired. Pulodova concerned herself, in her research, with the effects of high altitudes on pregnancy and with the physiology of girls as they reach puberty. Her writings include Pregnancy and the Principles for Blood Coagulation in Tajikistan's Dry, Subtropic Conditions (Dushanbe, 1970) and The Humoral Aspects of the Immunological Process in Early Ontogenesis (Dushanbe, 1979). She received a number of awards for her work, being recognized as a Distinguished Scientist of the Tajik SSR in 1978 and receiving the Order of the Red Banner of Labour and several other medals for the government. During her career she traveled to India, Italy, and Iran.
